Verbena, also known as vervain or verveine, is a genus in the family Verbenaceae. It contains about 150 species of annual and perennial herbaceous or semi-woody flowering plants. The majority of the species are native to the Americas and Asia; however, Verbena officinalis, the common vervain or common verbena, is the type species and native to Europe.

Naming
In English, the name Verbena is usually used in the United States and the United Kingdom, whereas elsewhere the terms verveine or vervain are in use. When used alone, the terms usually refer to common verbena.

Description
Verbena is an herbaceous flowering plant, belonging to the Verbenaceae family, and may be annual or perennial depending on the species. The leaves are usually opposite, simple, and in many species hairy, often densely so. The flowers are small, with five petals, and borne in dense spikes. Typically some shade of blue, they may also be white, pink, or purple, especially in cultivars.

The genus can be divided into a diploid North American and a polyploid South American lineage, both with a base chromosome number of seven. The European species is derived from the North American lineage. It seems that verbena as well as the related mock vervains (Glandularia) evolved from the assemblage provisionally treated under the genus name Junellia; both other genera were usually included in the Verbenaceae until the 1990s. Intergeneric chloroplast gene transfer by an undetermined mechanism – though probably not hybridization – has occurred at least twice from vervains to Glandularia, between the ancestors of the present-day South American lineages and once more recently, between V. orcuttiana or V. hastata and G. bipinnatifida. In addition, several species of verbena are of natural hybrid origin; the well-known garden vervain/verbena has an entirely muddy history. The relationships of this close-knit group are therefore hard to resolve with standard methods of computational phylogenetics.

Cultivation

Some species, hybrids and cultivars of verbena are used as ornamental plants. They are drought-resistant, tolerating full to partial sun, and enjoy well-drained, average soils. Plants are usually grown from seed. Some species and hybrids are not hardy and are treated as half-hardy annuals in bedding schemes.

They are valued in butterfly gardening in suitable climates, attracting Lepidoptera such as the Hummingbird hawk-moth, Chocolate albatross, or the Pipevine swallowtail, and also hummingbirds, especially V. officinalis, which is also grown as a honey plant.

The hybrid cultivars "Silver Anne" and "Sissinghurst" have gained the Royal Horticultural Society's Award of Garden Merit.

Pests and diseases
For some verbena pathogens, see List of verbena diseases. Cultivated verbenas are sometimes parasitized by sweet potato whitefly (Bemisia tabaci) and spread this pest to other crops.

Uses
Although verbena ("vervain") has been used in herbalism and traditional medicine, usually as an herbal tonic, there is no high-quality evidence for its effectiveness. Verbena has been listed as one of the 38 plants used to prepare Bach flower remedies, a kind of alternative medicine promoted for its effect on health. According to Cancer Research UK, "essence therapists believe that using essences can help to increase your mental, emotional and spiritual wellbeing. However, essences are not used to prevent, control, or cure cancer or any other physical condition."

The essential oil of various species, mainly common vervain, is traded as "Spanish verbena oil". Considered inferior to oil of lemon verbena (Aloysia citrodora) in perfumery, it is of some commercial importance for herbalism.

In culture

Verbena has long been associated with divine and other supernatural forces. It was called "tears of Isis" in ancient Egypt, and later called "Hera's tears". In ancient Greece it was dedicated to Eos Erigineia. The generic name is the Latin term for a plant sacred to the ancient Romans. Pliny the Elder describes verbena presented on Jupiter altars; it is not entirely clear if this referred to a verbena rather than the general term for prime sacrificial herbs.

Pliny the Elder notes "the Magi especially make the maddest statements about the plant: that [among other things] a circle must be drawn with iron round the plant". The common names of verbena in many Central and Eastern European languages often associate it with iron. These include for example the Dutch  ("iron-hard"), Danish  ("medical ironwort"), German  ("true ironherb"), Slovak  ("medical ironherb"), and Hungarian  ("iron grass").

In the early Christian era, folk legend stated that V. officinalis was used to staunch Jesus' wounds after his removal from the cross. It was consequently called "holy herb" or (e.g. in Wales) "Devil's bane".

According to the Wiccan writer Doreen Valiente, Vervain flowers signify the goddess Diana and are often depicted on cimaruta, traditional Italian amulets. In the 1870 The History and Practice of Magic by "Paul Christian" (Jean-Baptiste Pitois) it is employed in the preparation of a mandragora charm. The book also describes its antiseptic capabilities (p. 336), and use as a protection against spells (pp. 339, 414).

While common vervain is not native to North America, it has been introduced there and for example the Pawnee have adopted it as an entheogen enhancer and in oneiromancy (dream divination), much as Calea zacatechichi is used in Mexico.

An indeterminate vervain is among the plants on the eighth panel of the New World Tapestry (Expedition to Cape Cod).

In the Victorian language of flowers, verbena held the dual meaning of enchantment and sensibility.

Species
The following species are accepted:
(See also Aloysia, Glandularia and Junellia for species formerly placed here.)

Verbena alata Otto ex Sweet
Verbena alejandrana (B.L.Turner) Christenh. & Byng
Verbena × allenii Moldenke
Verbena amoena Paxton
Verbena andalgalensis Moldenke
Verbena angustilobata (Moldenke) Christenh. & Byng
Verbena araucana Phil.
Verbena aristigera S.Moore
Verbena atacamensis Reiche
Verbena aurantiaca Speg.
Verbena bajacalifornica Moldenke
Verbena balansae Briq.
Verbena barbata Graham
Verbena berteroi (Meisn.) Schauer
Verbena × bingenensis Moldenke
Verbena bipinnatifida Schauer
Verbena × blanchardii Moldenke
Verbena bonariensis L. – purpletop vervain, clustertop vervain, tall verbena, pretty verbena, South American vervain
Verbena brachyrhynchos (G.L.Nesom & Vorobik) Christenh. & Byng
Verbena bracteata Cav. ex Lag. & Rodr. – prostrate vervain, large-bracted vervain
Verbena brasiliensis Vell. – Brazilian verbena, Brazilian vervain
Verbena cabrerae Moldenke
Verbena californica Moldenke – California vervain, Red Hills vervain
Verbena calinfera G.L.Nesom
Verbena canadensis (L.) Britton
Verbena canescens Kunth – gray vervain
Verbena caniuensis Moldenke
Verbena carnea Medik.
Verbena carolina L.
Verbena catharinae Moldenke
Verbena cheitmaniana Moldenke
Verbena chiricahensis (Umber) Moldenke
Verbena × clemensiorum Moldenke
Verbena cloverae Moldenke
Verbena corymbosa Ruiz & Pav.
Verbena cuneifolia Ruiz & Pav.
Verbena dalloniana Quézel
Verbena × deamii Moldenke
Verbena delicatula Mart. & Zucc.
Verbena delticola Small ex Perry
Verbena demissa Moldenke
Verbena dissecta Willd. ex Spreng.
Verbena dusenii Moldenke
Verbena ehrenbergiana Schauer
Verbena elegans Kunth
Verbena × engelmannii Moldenke
Verbena ephedroides Cham.
Verbena falcata G.L.Nesom
Verbena filicaulis Schauer
Verbena flava Gillies & Hook.
Verbena glabrata Kunth
Verbena gooddingii Briq.
Verbena × goodmanii Moldenke
Verbena goyazensis Moldenke
Verbena gracilescens (Cham.) Herter
Verbena gracilis Desf.
Verbena grisea B.L.Rob. & Greenm.
Verbena guaibensis (P.Peralta & V.Thode) Christenh. & Byng
Verbena guaranitica (Tronc.) Moldenke
Verbena gynobasis Wedd.
Verbena halei Small – Texas vervain
Verbena hassleriana Briq.
Verbena hastata L. – swamp verbena, blue vervain
Verbena hatschbachii Moldenke
Verbena herteri Moldenke
Verbena hirta Spreng.
Verbena hispida Ruiz & Pav.
Verbena humifusa Cham.
Verbena × illicita Moldenke
Verbena incompta P.W.Michael
Verbena intermedia Gillies & Hook.
Verbena jessicae Nesom & G.S.Hinton
Verbena jordanensis Moldenke
Verbena kuntzeana Moldenke
Verbena laciniata (L.) Briq.
Verbena landbeckii Phil.
Verbena lasiostachys Link – western vervain
Verbena lilacina Greene
Verbena lilloana Moldenke
Verbena lindbergii Moldenke
Verbena lindmanii Briq.
Verbena lipozygioides Walp.
Verbena litoralis Kunth – seashore vervain
Verbena livermorensis B.L.Turner & G.L.Nesom
Verbena lobata Vell.
Verbena macdougalii A.Heller
Verbena macrosperma Speg.
Verbena madrensis G.L.Nesom
Verbena malmii Moldenke
Verbena malpaisana (T.Van Devender & G.L.Nesom) Christenh. & Byng
Verbena maritima Small
Verbena marrubioides Cham.
Verbena megapotamica Spreng.
Verbena mendocina Phil.
Verbena menthifolia Benth. – mint vervain
Verbena microphylla Kunth
Verbena moctezumae G.L.Nesom & T.Van Devender
Verbena × moechina Moldenke
Verbena montevidensis Spreng. – Uruguayan verbena
Verbena moranii G.L.Nesom
Verbena multiglandulosa Moldenke
Verbena nana Moldenke
Verbena neomexicana (A.Gray) Briq. – hillside vervain
Verbena officinalis L. – common vervain, simpler's joy, holy herb, mosquito plant, wild hyssop, herb of the cross (type species)
Verbena × ostenii Moldenke
Verbena ovata Cham.
Verbena paraguariensis Moldenke
Verbena paranensis Moldenke
Verbena parodii (Covas & Schnack) Moldenke
Verbena paulensis Moldenke
Verbena perennis Wooton – pinleaf vervain
Verbena × perriana Moldenke
Verbena × perturbata Moldenke
Verbena peruviana (L.) Britton
Verbena phlogiflora Cham.
Verbena pinetorum Moldenke
Verbena platensis Spreng.
Verbena plicata Greene
Verbena polyantha (Umber) Moldenke
Verbena porrigens Phil.
Verbena pumila Rydb.
Verbena quadrangulata A.Heller
Verbena racemosa Eggert
Verbena radicata Moldenke
Verbena recta Kunth
Verbena rectiloba Moldenke
Verbena regnelliana Moldenke
Verbena reitzii Moldenke
Verbena ribifolia Walp.
Verbena rigida Spreng. – tuberous vervain
Verbena rugosa Mill.
Verbena × rydbergii Moldenke
Verbena sagittalis Cham.
Verbena santiaguensis (Covas & Schnack) Moldenke
Verbena scabra Vahl – sandpaper vervain
Verbena scabrella Sessé & Moc.
Verbena scrobiculata Griseb.
Verbena selloi Spreng.
Verbena sessilis (Cham.) Kuntze
Verbena simplex Lehm. – narrow-leaved vervain
Verbena sphaerocarpa L.M.Perry
Verbena stellarioides Cham.
Verbena stricta Vent. – hoary vervain
Verbena strigosa Cham.
Verbena × stuprosa Moldenke
Verbena subincana (Tronc.) Shinners
Verbena sulphurea D.Don
Verbena supina L.
Verbena tampensis Nash
Verbena tecticaulis Tronc.
Verbena tenera Spreng.
Verbena teucriifolia M.Martens & Galeotti
Verbena thymoides Cham.
Verbena tomophylla Briq.
Verbena townsendii Svenson
Verbena tumidula L.M.Perry
Verbena turneri (G.L.Nesom) Christenh. & Byng
Verbena tweedieana Niven ex Hook.
Verbena urticifolia L. – white vervain
Verbena × uruguayensis Moldenke
Verbena valerianoides Kunth
Verbena venturii Moldenke
Verbena verecunda (Umber) Moldenke
Verbena villifolia Hayek
Verbena xutha Lehm. – gulf vervain

Gallery

References

External links

 

 
Garden plants
Verbenaceae genera
Medicinal plants